Aaron Rosser Titlow (November 22, 1857 – January 6, 1923) was a Washington state lawyer and politician. Titlow served as a prosecuting attorney for Pierce County from 1896 to 1898 and was the Democratic National Committeeman from the state of Washington from 1920 to 1923. As of 2020, he's best remembered for Titlow Beach, a popular  waterfront public park in Tacoma which was purchased from Titlow's family in 1928 by Metro Parks Tacoma.

Titlow settled in Tacoma, Washington, in 1888 and made many successful real estate investments that brought him wealth and prominence. As a lawyer, he was involved in several high-profile cases, defending public interest against corporate interests. In 1893, he won a court case representing the public interest against Tacoma City Council and Tacoma Light and Water Company, saving $787,000 ($22.6 million in 2020 dollars) in public money. In 1909, Titlow protected his real estate interests and public access rights to the waterfront, fending off James J. Hill and Northern Pacific Railroad's attempt to monopolize the Tacoma waterfront.

Although Titlow did not hold any public office (with the exception of his two-year prosecuting attorney term), he became an influential political figure in Washington state as a Democratic Party factioneer. Titlow was a campaign manager for George Turner, contributing to his election to US Senate and supported James M. Cox during the presidential election of 1920.

As of 2020, Titlow's residence on Sheridan Avenue in Tacoma and the remnants of his Hesperides Hotel on Titlow Beach (now known as Titlow Lodge) are historic landmarks.

Early life and education 
Titlow was born on a farm near Dayton, Ohio, on November 22, 1857, into a family of Dutch ancestry. Two years after Titlow's birth, his father, Aaron Titlow (1829–1912), and his mother, Jane (Casad) Titlow (1831–1914) moved to Delphi, Indiana, in search of better farming opportunities. Titlow grew up on his parents' farm and attended Delphi public school. He had four sisters: Alice Ann (1855–1925), Mead G. (1865–1937), Read S. (1870–1917), and Lora (1872–1951).

While in school, Titlow developed an ambition to become a lawyer and studied Blackstone's Commentaries on the Laws of England at Delphi. He later entered the law department of the Washington University in St. Louis, and graduated one year ahead of his class in 1885.

Early law career 

After graduating, Titlow returned to Delphi and was admitted to the bar. However, in search of more lucrative opportunities for his law practice, he decided to move. In 1886, he borrowed $60 ($1,670 in 2020 dollars) and moved south to Chattanooga, Tennessee, where he was welcomed by the local community. First, he practiced in a small new law firm, Titlow and Walker, which operated from an office on Seventh Avenue. A year later, Titlow joined two experienced lawyers who had recently moved from Indiana, and they formed a new law firm: Russel, Titlow, and Daniels. The new firm focused on business law, and Titlow began specializing in real estate cases.

Although Titlow was well received in Chattanooga and formed many friendships, he decided to move again to find better professional opportunities. In 1888, just as Washington Territory was about to join the Union and become Washington state, Titlow moved to Tacoma, Washington.

Career in Tacoma

Early legal career and real estate dealings 
Titlow came to Tacoma in 1888 and later formed the law firm Titlow & Applegate. He also invested all the earnings he had accumulated in Tennessee, into Tacoma real estate. This investment proved to be very successful, propelling Titlow from "rags to riches." In addition to Tacoma, many of Titlow's real estate holdings were in Gig Harbor and on Fox Island. By 1903, Titlow owned three farms and approximately 300 lots in the Tacoma vicinity.

High profile cases 
In 1893, the Tacoma City Council voted to purchase Tacoma Light and Water Company for $1,750,000, while the value of the company's assets was estimated to be under $600,000 ($50 million and $17 million in 2020 dollars respectively.) Although the purchase was explained away as the city's way to escape the "corporate grip," it was rumored that the Light and Water Company had spent $50,000 ($1.5 million in 2020 dollars.) to carry the City Council vote in the favor of the purchase. Titlow raised the alarm, doubting that the purchase conformed with public interest. On April 7, 1893, he publicly debated councilman John W. Berry on the issue. Unable to convince the City council, Titlow took the matter to court, joined by John A. Shackleford. Titlow and Shackleford won the case, securing a $787,000 ($22.6 million in 2020 dollars) judgement against the Light and Water company. The case earned Titlow the reputation of a person who couldn't be bought by corporate interests.

On September 14, 1895, Titlow was appointed as receiver for two bankrupt institutions: the Bank of Tacoma and the Tacoma Trust and Savings Bank. He led a "sensational" investigation that unearthed dubious dealings in municipal bonds and eventually led to the arrests of the banks' management in October 1895.

In 1909, Titlow entered a legal battle with Northern Pacific Railroad around Tacoma waterfront access. The railroad's local interests in Tacoma were personified by railroad magnate James J. Hill. Titlow framed the battle as a fight for public interest against the railroad's monopoly on waterfront access; however, Titlow had his own financial interest in the matter, as the railroad's plans would have interfered with the ferry service between Tacoma and Fox Island, the location of many of his real estate interests. The railroad eventually abandoned its plans.

Political career 
Titlow was a Republican until 1896, when he switched allegiance and became a Democrat. He claimed that he was dissatisfied with the Republican party's handling of the "money question." That same year, Titlow was elected on a Democratic ticket as a prosecuting attorney for Pierce County, replacing his former ally John A. Shackleford. Titlow served in this capacity until 1898, and that remained the only political office that Titlow served.

Beginning in 1896, Titlow emerged as an active and high-profile Washington state politician. Although he never sought public office after 1898, Titlow developed influence and prominence through his appointments within the Democratic party. In 1896, Titlow publicly supported Washington state governor and populist John R. Rogers. In 1897, he managed George Turner's successful campaign for the US Senate.

In later years, Titlow became a strong ally of Hugh C. Wallace, succeeding him as the Washington state Democratic National Committeeman on May 19, 1920. As committeeman, Titlow succeeded in modifying the party platform to Tacoma's advantage: he included a provision for equal division of vessels between Atlantic and Pacific fleets, which benefitted Tacoma and Seattle among other ports along the Pacific Coast.

Titlow was a strong favorite of the free silver measure and a strong supporter of William Jennings Bryan, the Democratic party heavyweight of the time. As Democratic National Committee chairman Homer S. Cummings retired, Titlow supported the candidacy of Eliakim H. Moore for the post, but the chairmanship went to George White.

Titlow supported the re-election bid of Woodrow Wilson's campaign for a third presidential term. However, once it became clear that Wilson wouldn't attempt re-election for health reasons, Titlow opposed James A. Reed and supported James M. Cox as the presidential nominee in 1920. Titlow believed that Cox would carry Washington state and win the presidency. After Cox lost the presidential election to Republican Warren G. Harding in a landslide, Titlow initially advocated for the immediate resignation of the party chairman, George White, but later withdrew his signature.

Career in hospitality 

In 1911, Titlow built the Hesperides Hotel which was designed by famous Tacoma architect Frederick Heath in the Swiss chalet style. The 3.5-story wood-frame building cost $50,000 ($1.4 million in 2020 dollars) and had 30 guest rooms. It was built on  waterfront property that Titlow acquired in 1903, and is currently known as Titlow Park. This property was an important cornerstone of Titlow's real estate holdings, as it was the terminal end of the ferry service, connecting Tacoma with Gig Harbor and Fox Island—the sites of Titlow's other major real estate investments. In 1909, Titlow fought railroad magnate James J. Hill and Northern Pacific Railroad in court to protect the waterfront access and ferry operation.

The construction of the hotel was a long-lasting dream of Titlow's, and he and his family operated the hotel. Titlow's son Marcus worked as a bellboy. All the food for the hotel was supplied by one of the Titlow's farms.

The hotel offered the most luxurious amenities of the era: bathrooms with hot water, a barber shop, pool tables, a variety of boats for exploring Puget Sound (including a glass-bottom boat) with glass bottom, and a salt-water public pool, the first public pool in the Tacoma area. Although Titlow's plans to obtain a liquor license for the hotel were thwarted by local women activists of the temperance movement, the hotel developed into a popular resort. The hotel rooms were often occupied by upper-class citizens. Other amenities were frequented by the middle-class public who arrived either in personal automobiles (which were becoming more and more popular) or via a dedicated bus service. The location of the hotel—at the ferry terminal stop for Gig Harbor and Fox Island—contributed to its popularity.

Personal life and death 

On April 26, 1893, Titlow married Stella Smart (1870–1936), who was from his hometown of Dayton. By 1903, the family included three daughters: Ione M. (1894–1981), Constance (1896–1979), Marcelle Isabelle (1899–1983). Aaron Rosser Jr. (b. 1902) died during infancy. The couple later had two more children: Lucile (1904–1990) and Marcus R. (1906–1995).

In Tacoma, the family lived in a luxurious, Colonial Revival-styled house at 410 South Sheridan Street, which was custom-built for Titlow in 1899 Titlow was an active member of Phi Delta Phi society, and a parishioner of the Episcopal Church

Titlow died on January 6, 1923, after a "lingering illness." He was survived by his wife and five children.

Legacy 

After Titlow's death in 1923, his position as the Democratic National Committeeman was filled by George Francis Christensen. Shortly after Titlow's death, his house on Sheridan Street was purchased by a contractor, Andrew Larson, who remodeled it as a multi-family unit. As of 2010, the house is part of Tacoma's historic Wedge District and attraction #16 of the city center historic tour.

The City of Tacoma named a road after Titlow—South Titlow Road, the 6th Avenue. In Tacoma, however, Titlow is best known for Titlow Beach. In 1928, five years after Titlow's death, the family sold the Titlow Beach property and Hesperides Hotel to Metro Parks Tacoma, and it was converted to a public park. During the Great Depression, Metro Parks planned to demolish the hotel, but the local community protested this decision. In 1938, the hotel was renovated. Its upper stories were removed, and it was converted into a community center now known as Titlow Lodge. On April 12, 2018, Titlow Lodge was designated as a Tacoma Historic Landmark.

After the construction of the Tacoma Narrows Bridge, the ferries to Gig Harbor and Fox Island became obsolete. In 1958, the salt-water pool on the property was converted into a fresh water pool. It is being serviced by Titlow pumping station. As of 2020, Titlow Beach remains a popular year-round destination for the local community. Titlow Lodge is used for weddings and other community gatherings. Its three miles of designated trails is part of Tacoma Urban Trails. Descendants of Aaron Titlow from different parts of US gathered on Titlow Beach in September 2015.

Notes

References

Literature cited

External links 
 Titlow Beach page on Metro Parks Tacoma
 

1857 births
1923 deaths
Washington (state) pioneers
History of Tacoma, Washington
Washington (state) Democrats
Tennessee lawyers
Washington (state) lawyers
Washington University in St. Louis alumni
Washington University School of Law alumni